Narendra Mehta is an Indian politician. He was a member of the Bharatiya Janata Party. He served in the Maharashtra Legislative Assembly. Mehta represents the Mira Bhayandar constituency.

Personal life 
Mehta was born in a lower middle class family on 25 September 1972. A school dropout of 8th standard, Mehta went on to join politics and become the mayor of Mira-Bhayander Municipal corporation.

Career 
Narendra Mehta joined politics in 1997. He was a member of the municipal corporation and later went on to become the Mayor. As a businessman Mehta is into several businesses including construction, education and healthcare. In 2002, he was arrested in relation to a corruption charge. Later after a 14 year legal battle in 2016, he was acquitted of all charges by the court after prosecution failed to produce evidences beyond doubt in the court. In 2017, there was a buzz when he gifted his wife Suman an expensive luxury car on her birthday. Mehta again found himself at the centre of political attention after Mrs Mehta hit the car into an auto while driving. Fortunately no one was hurt in the incident.

Later again in 2017, Mehta and five Mira Bhayander Municipal Corporation officers were booked in a Rs 2 Crore extortion case against a builder. The case is currently under investigation.

On 28 February, he and 200 others were booked for rioting in Thane four days earlier. Mehta and the other rioters had staged a protest in front of a local police station and then moved to the home of Vasant Mane, where Mehta threatened him and his family. Mehta and the rioters then proceeded to ransack Mane's house. He is also owner of Seven Eleven group.

In 2019 Maharashtra Legislative Assembly election, he lost to Geeta Bharat Jain by about 15,535 votes.

On 24 February 2020, Narendra Mehta quits BJP from all post and also apologize to Other party leaders.

Positions held 
Maharashtra Legislative Assembly MLA
Terms in office:2014-2019.

References 

Bharatiya Janata Party politicians from Maharashtra
Maharashtra MLAs 2014–2019
Living people
1972 births